Bageshwar (Kumaoni: Bāgshyār) is a town and a municipal board in Bageshwar district in the state of Uttarakhand, India. It is located at a distance of 470 km from the National Capital New Delhi and 332 km from the State Capital Dehradun. Bageshwar is known for its scenic environment, glaciers, rivers and temples. It is also the administrative headquarters of Bageshwar district.

Situated on the confluence of Saryu and Gomati rivers, Bageshwar is surrounded by the mountains of Bhileshwar and Nileshwar to its east and west and by the Suraj Kund in the north and Agni Kund in the south. Bageshwar was a major trade mart between Tibet and Kumaun, and was frequented by the Bhotia traders, who bartered Tibetan wares, wool, salt and Borax in exchange for Carpets and other local produces in Bageshwar. The trade routes were, however, closed after the Indo-China War of 1962.

The city is of great religious, historic and political significance. Bageshwar finds mention in various puranas, where, it has been associated with Lord Shiva. The Uttrayani fair held annually in Bageshwar used to be visited by approx 15,000 people in the early twentieth century, and was the largest fair of Kumaon division. The fair became the epicenter of the Coolie Begar Movement in January 1921. The city of Bageshwar gets its name from the Bagnath Temple. Hindi and Sanskrit are the official Languages however Kumaoni is spoken by a large number of people.

History

The city and Bagnath Temple find mention in the Manaskhand of Shiva Purana, where it is written that the temple and its surrounding city was built by Chandeesh, a servant of the Hindu deity Shiva. According to another Hindu Legend, Sage Markandeya worshipped Lord Shiva here. Lord Shiva blessed sage Markandeya by visiting here in the form of a Tiger.

Bageshwar has historically been a part of Kumaon Kingdom. Bageshwar was located adjacent to Kartikeypura, the then capital of Katyuri Kings that ruled over Kumaon in the 7th century.  After death of Birdeo the last king of united katyuri kingdom. the kingdom disintegrated in the 13th century giving rise to 8 different princely states. Bageshwar region remained under the rule of Baijnath Katyurs descendants of Katyuri kings, till 1565 until king Balo Kalyan Chand of Almora annexed the region to Kumaon In the 10th century, the Chand dynasty was established by Som Chand. He displaced the Katyuri Kings, called his state Kurmanchal and established its capital in Champawat in Kali Kumaon. In 1568, Kalyan Chand established a permanent capital at Khagmara and called it Almora.

In 1791, the Gorkhas of Nepal while expanding their kingdom westwards across Kali River, invaded and overran Almora, the seat of the Kumaon Kingdom and other parts of Kumaon including Bageshwar. The Gorkhas were defeated by the East India Company in Anglo-Nepalese War in 1814 and were forced to cede Kumaon to the British as part of the Treaty of Sugauli in 1816.

The Kumaon region was joined with the eastern half of the Garhwal region and was governed as a chief-commissionership, also known as the Kumaon Province, on the non-regulation system. According to Atkinson's The Himalayan Gazetteer, Bageshwar had a population of 500 in 1886. In 1891, the division was composed of the three districts of Kumaon, Garhwal and the Tarai; but the two districts of Kumaon and the Tarai were subsequently redistributed and renamed after their headquarters, Nainital and Almora.

Before the First World War, the British Government did a Survey for a rail link connecting Bageshwar with Tanakpur in 1902. However, the project was stalled by British due to The World War. The Surveys restarted in the 1980s after Indira Gandhi visited Bageshwar. The first motor road arrived in Bageshwar in 1952 from Almora via Garur. Bus services started operating on the Bageshwar-Kapkot motorway in 1955-56. After the 1962 India-China War, an important strategic road connecting Bageshwar with Pithoragarh was completed in 1965.

In the early phase of its urban development, the central township of Bageshwar was a group of 9 small mutually tangled group of villages which had 3 uninhabited and 6 occupied villages. The Bageshwar State village was formed in 1948 by joining these villages. Bageshwar was declared a town in 1955, under the UP Town Area Act of 1914, and the first Town area committee was constituted in 1957. Bageshwar received the status of a notified area committee in 1962 and municipal Council in 1968. The pumping water supply scheme was introduced in Bageshwar town in 1975. The estimate for water supply was prepared in 1968-69 for a designed population of 6000 persons for the year 1997.

In the early twentieth century, dispensary (1906) and Post Office (1909) were established in Bageshwar. A public school started in 1926, which was made junior high school in 1933. After independence by several attempts from local residents, a private high school was opened in 1949 in memory of Victor Mohan Joshi, which became an Inter College in 1967. The first women's primary school started in the 1950s and women's public high school started in 1975. A new Government Degree College was inaugurated in 1974 by the then Chief Minister Hemwati Nandan Bahuguna.

After Independence of India in 1947, Bageshwar was a part of the Almora District. Bageshwar had a population of 1740 people according to the 1951 Census. It was part of the Kanda development block, that was later converted into Bageshwar development block. On 15 September 1997 the Bageshwar district was carved out of Almora district by then Uttar Pradesh Chief Minister Mayawati and Bageshwar became its Headquarter. On 9 November 2000, Bageshwar came in the Uttarakhand State that was created from the Himalayan and adjoining northwestern districts of Uttar Pradesh.

Geography and Climate

It is situated 470 km North-East of the National Capital New Delhi and 332 km South-East of the State Capital Dehradun. It lies in the Kumaon division and is situated 153 km North-East of Nainital, the Headquarters of Kumaon. Bageshwar is situated in a valley of the Kumaon Hills of the Central Himalaya range. It has an average elevation of 934 metres (3,064 feet). The chief trees are the Chir Pine, Himalayan Cypress, Pindrow Fir, alder, sal or iron-wood, and saindan. Limestone, sandstone, slate, gneiss and granite constitute the principal geological formations.

Its climate is characterized by relatively high temperatures and evenly distributed precipitation throughout the year. In summer, Bageshwar is largely under the influence of moist, maritime airflow from the western side of the subtropical anticyclonic cells over low-latitude ocean waters. Temperatures are high and can lead to warm, oppressive nights. Summers are usually somewhat wetter than winters, with much of the rainfall coming from convectional thunderstorm activity; tropical cyclones also enhance warm-season rainfall in some regions. The coldest month is usually quite mild, although frosts are not uncommon, and winter precipitation is derived primarily from frontal cyclones along the polar front. The Köppen Climate Classification subtype for this climate is "Cfa". (Humid Subtropical Climate).

The average temperature for the year in Bageshwar is 20.4 °C (68.8 °F). The warmest month, on average, is June with an average temperature of 27.3 °C (81.2 °F). The highest temperature ever recorded was 38 °C, recorded on 5 June 2017. The coolest month on average is January, with an average temperature of 11 °C (51.8 °F). The average amount of precipitation for the year in Bageshwar is 48.1" (1221.7 mm). The month with the most precipitation on average is July with 13.0" (330.2 mm) of precipitation. The month with the least precipitation on average is November with an average of 0.2" (5.1 mm). There are an average of 63.6 days of precipitation, with the most precipitation occurring in August with 15.3 days and the least precipitation occurring in November with 0.8 days.

Demographics

According to the 2011 census of India, Bageshwar has a population of 9,079 comprising 4,711 males and 4,368 females. Males constitute approximately 55% of the population and females 45%. The sex ratio of bageshwar is 1090 women per 1000 men, higher than the national Average of 940 women per 1000 men. The City ranked 4th in Uttarakhand in terms of Sex Ratio. Bageshwar has an average literacy rate of 80%, higher than the national average of 72.1%; with 84% of the males and 76% of females literate. 11% of the population is under 6 years of age. 2,219 people belong to the Scheduled Castes while the population of people belonging to Scheduled Tribes is 1,085. Bageshwar had a population of 7803 according to 2001 Census and 5,772 according to the 1991 census.

Out of total population, 2,771 were engaged in work or business activity. Of this 2,236 were males while 535 were females. In census survey, worker is defined as person who does business, job, service, and cultivator and labour activity. Of total 2771 working population, 78.06% were engaged in Main Work while 21.94% of total workers were engaged in Marginal Work.

Hinduism is practiced by 93.34% of total population and is the religion of the Majority in Bageshwar. Other Religions include Islam (5.93%), Sikhism (0.25%), Christianity (0.26%), Buddhism (0.01%) and Jainism (0.02%).

Kumaoni is the majority first language, although Hindi and Sanskrit are the official languages of the state.English is also spoken by a small number of people.

Government and Politics
The Bageshwar Assembly seat is reserved for a person belonging to the Scheduled Castes. Chandan Ram Das from Bharatiya Janata Party is the present MLA OF Bageshwar. Bageshwar is a "Nagar Palika Parishad" (Municipal Council) city in district of Bageshwar, Uttarakhand. The Bageshwar city is divided into 7 wards, for which elections are held every 5 years. The Bageshwar Nagar Palika Parishad has population of 9,079 of which 4,711 are males while 4,368 are females as per report released by Census India 2011. Suresh khetwal from Independent candidate is the Mayor of Bageshwar. Bageshwar Nagar Palika Parishad has total administration over 2,054 houses to which it supplies basic amenities like water and sewerage. It is also authorized to build roads within Nagar Palika Parishad limits and impose taxes on properties coming under its jurisdiction. The Uttarakhand Power Corporation Ltd. (UPCL) is responsible for supply of electricity in the city. Uttarakhand Jal Vidyut Nigam Ltd. generates electricity from the 8.5 MW electric sub-station at Bageshwar. The Notified Area Committee, Bageshwar is responsible for approval of building plans after getting no objection certificate from various departments like Jal Nigam, PWD, Electricity Board and Health Department etc.

Economy

Bageshwar's largest economic sectors include agriculture, trade, transportation, municipal, tourism and resource extraction. Copper Utensils and Carpets were listed as the two most important industrial commodities produced in Bageshwar in the 2011 Census of India. Large portions of the local economy of Bageshwar depend on its geographical location and surrounding natural resources. Per Capita Income of Bageshwar was Rs 22709 in 2015. Bageshwar is a major tourist destination and acts as a starting point for many trekking routes notably being to Pindari, Kafni and Sunderdhunga Glacier. It also lies along the path to Kailash-Mansarovar pilgrimage.

Bageshwar has traditionally been a major gateway for trade with Central Asia and Tibet. It carried on a brisk trade between Central Asia and Kumaon, and was described in The Imperial Gazetteer of India as "one of the main outlets for the Tibetan traffic". The Bhotiya traders travelled to Tibet and sold their wares at major fairs in Bageshwar, Gyanema and Gartok. The city was once rich in agriculture and animal husbandry. Besides growing crops, people were mainly engaged in sheep rearing. However, agriculture and sheep rearing in Bageshwar have suffered as villagers, who are increasingly joining armed forces, after retirement are settling down in Bageshwar town instead of their native villages.

The traditional Uttarayani festival organised since centuries on the banks of the Sarju and Gomati rivers was the main place where woollen outfits made by Saukas of Munsiyari were brought form higher valleys for ages, thus strengthening trade links between the two communities.

As of 2006, Bageshwar had a total of 6 Health Care units including four Hospitals (Two Allopathic, one Ayurvedi and one Homeopathic), one Maternity & Child welfare centre and one Community Health Centre. Bageshwar has a total of Five Nationalized Bank’s, Two Post Offices, One Telegraph Office, 80 PCO'S and 1844 Telephone Connections. Mobile Communication services are provided by Private companies like Vodafone, Airtel, Idea, Reliance etc.

Culture

Many classical dance forms and folk art are practised in the city. Some well-known dances include Hurkiya Baul, Jhora-Chanchri and Chholiya. Music is an integral part of the Kumaoni culture. Popular types of folk songs include Mangal and Nyoli. These folk songs are played on instruments including dhol, damau, turri, ransingha, dholki, daur, thali, bhankora, mandan and mashakbaja. Music is also used as a medium through which the gods are invoked. Jagar is a form of spirit worship in which the singer, or Jagariya, sings a ballad of the gods, with allusions to great epics, like Mahabharat and Ramayana, that describe the adventures and exploits of the god being invoked. Ramleela has been staged annually during the autumn festival of Navratri since 1948 in Bageshwar.

The primary food of Bageshwar is vegetables with wheat being a staple. A distinctive characteristic of Kumaoni cuisine is the sparing use of tomatoes, milk, and milk based products. Coarse grain with high fibre content is very common in Kumaon due to the harsh terrain. Another crop which is associated with Kumaon is Buckwheat (locally called Kotu or Kuttu). Generally, either Desi Ghee or Mustard oil is used for the purpose of cooking food. Simple recipes are made interesting with the use of hash seeds Jakhya as spice. Bal Mithai is a popular fudge-like sweet. Other local dishes include Dubuk, Chains, Kap, Chutkani, Sei, and gulgula. A regional variation of Kadhi called Jhoi or Jholi is also popular.

Temples

Hinduism is practiced by 93.34% and is the religion of the Majority in Bageshwar therefore Various Temples are situated in Bageshwar. the major one being:
Bagnath Temple
At the junction of the rivers, Gomati and Sarju stands a large temple with its conical tower. Here is the shrine of Bageswar or Vyagreswar, the, "Tiger Lord", an epithet of Lord Siva. This temple was erected by the Kumaun king, Laxmi Chand, about 1450 A.D., but there is a Sanskrit inscription there of a far earlier date. The temple is flooded with devotees on the annual occasion of Shivratri. This place has a cluster of temples. Prominent among these temples are the Bairav temple, Dattatrey Maharaj, Ganga Mai temple, Hanuman temple, Durga temple, Kalika temple, Thingal Bhirav temple, Panchnam Junakhara and the Vaneshwar temple.

Baijnath Temple
Baijnath Temple is located on the left bank of the Gomti river. This is a shiv temple which was built by a brahmin widow.

Chandika Temple
A temple dedicated to Goddess Chandika stands at a distance of about half a kilometre from Bageshwar. Every year, the temple bustles with activity as the devout congregate here to offer pujas to the deity during the Navratras.

Sriharu Temple
Another important temple, the Sriharu temple, is situated at a distance of about 5 km from Bageshwer. The devotees believe that prayers for wish fulfilment here never go in vein. Every year, a large fair is organised on the Vijya Dashmi day following the Navratras.

Gauri Udiyar
This is situated 8 km from Bageshwer. A large cave, measuring 20 m x 95 m is situated here, which houses the idols of Lord Shiva.

Transport

Pantnagar Airport, located in Pantnagar is the primary Airport serving entire Kumaon Region. The Government is planning to develop Naini Saini Airport in Pithoragarh which once developed will be much nearer. Indira Gandhi International Airport, located in Delhi is the nearest international Airport.

Kathgodam railway station is the nearest railway station. Kathgodam is the last terminus of the broad gauge line of North East Railways that connects Kumaon with Delhi, Dehradun, and Howrah. A new Railway line connecting Bageshwar with Tanakpur has been a long-standing demand of the people of the region. the tanakpur-Bageshwar rail link was first planned by British in 1902. However the project was stalled by Railway ministry in 2016 citing the commercial viability of the rail line. There have also been speculations about another railway line, that would connect Bageshwar to Chaukhutia via Garur.

Bageshwar is well connected by motorable roads with major destinations of Uttarakhand state and northern India. The major roads passing through Bageshwar include NH 109K, NH 309A, Bareilly-Bageshwar Highway, and the Bageshwar-Someshwar-Dwarahat road. Uttarakhand Transport Corporation runs Buses from Bageshwar bus station to Delhi, Dehradun, Bareilly and Almora; while K.M.O.U (Kumaon Motor Owner's Union) runs 55 buses on various routes to Haldwani, Almora, Takula, Berinag, Pithoragarh, Didihat and Gangolihat. Taxis and Private Buses, mostly run by K.M.O.U, connect Bageshwar to other major destinations of Kumaon region. A Sub Regional Transport Office is located in Bageshwar where Vehicles are registered by the number UK-02.

A new bus station was inaugurated on 19 Feb 2020. The Bageshwar roadways bus station, located in Bilona, was constructed over a period of two years at an estimated cost of INR Two Crore.

Education

There are mainly government-run, private unaided (no government help), and private aided schools in the city. The language of instruction in the schools is either English or Hindi. The main school affiliations are CBSE, CISCE or UBSE, the state syllabus defined by the Department of Education of the Government of Uttarakhand. There are Eleven junior basic schools, three senior basic schools, two higher secondary schools and one post-graduate college to serve the needs of the population. The teacher-student ratio in Bageshwar is 1:47. Bageshwar has an average literacy rate of 80%, with 84% of the males and 76% of females literate.

The first public school in Bageshwar was started in 1926, which was made junior high school in 1933. Another private high school was opened in 1949 in memory of Victor Mohan Joshi, which became an Inter College in 1967. The first women's primary school started in the 1950s and women's public high school started in 1975. A new Government Degree College was inaugurated in 1974 by the then Chief Minister Hemwati Nandan Bahuguna.

Kumaon Kesari Pandit Badridutt Pandey Government PG College is located here.

See also
 Bageshwar district
 Kumaon Division
 Uttarakhand

External links

 Bageshwar city, Official website
 Official website of Bageshwar district

References

 
Cities and towns in Bageshwar district